United Grocery Outlet, also branded as Bargain Barn Inc. and GO: Grocery Outlet, is a regional discount supermarket chain based in Athens, Tennessee. In addition to its 24 locations in Tennessee, UGO has 9 locations in Western North Carolina, 3 locations in Georgia and single locations in Kentucky, Virginia, and Alabama. UGO is the largest closeout grocer in the Southeastern US.

References

Retail companies established in 1974
Companies based in Tennessee
Supermarkets of the United States
Privately held companies based in Tennessee
Food and drink in the United States
1974 establishments in Tennessee
Food and drink companies based in Tennessee